Sailcat was an American rock band that was signed with Elektra Records in the early 1970s, and best known for the hit song "Motorcycle Mama".

History

Creation of the band
The band, an early Southern pop/rock setup, was the innovation of John D. Wyker (March 14, 1945 – December 8, 2013)  and Court Pickett, who formed the group in 1971 near Decatur, Alabama, United States. Wyker was a veteran of the Muscle Shoals, Alabama, rock music scene who had been in The Rubber Band with John Townsend (later of the Sanford-Townsend Band). Pickett was the vocalist and bass player from Tuscaloosa, Alabama, who had just moved from Macon, Georgia, where he had been playing and singing for Sundown, a band that also had Chuck Leavell (formerly of the Rolling Stones and the Allman Brothers), Charlie Hayward (of the Charlie Daniels Band), and Lou Mullenix (from the Alex Taylor Band and Dr. John). Court was also the brother of Ed Pickett, of the foresaid The Rubber Band. In the 1960s, Ed played with other musicians in Granny's Gremlins in Tuscaloosa, Alabama, that included Hal Holbrook, Marvin Rust, and Bruce Stewart.

"Motorcycle Mama" success, and their breakup
An early demo tape of an album, cut by the duo (and included the song "Motorcycle Mama"), was initially discarded by the band but, after it was presented to Elektra Records, led to a recording contract and 1972 album release also titled Motorcycle Mama. The resulting album, produced by Pete Carr, was a concept album with a biker theme. The cover art and drawings inside the gatefold cover were drawn by Jack Davis, featuring motorcycles, predominately the Harley-Davidson with a series of drawings for each song on the album. The concept album's songs loosely tell the story of a motorcycle vagrant who apparently bums for a living, meeting a woman and settling down to start a family. However, he apparently keeps some of his selfish lazy behavior, as the last drawing shows him reclining on his porch, while his wife hangs the laundry and his child hoes the garden.

In 1972, the single "Motorcycle Mama" hit number 12 on the Billboard singles chart, and the album went to number 38 and led them to appearances on American Bandstand and at Carnegie Hall. In Canada, the single reached number 14. John D. Wyker and Sailcat performed both "Motorcycle Mama" and "Walking Together Backwards" on their first televised appearance on August 26, 1972. Sailcat toured to promote the album and released two more non-LP singles, "Baby Ruth" and "She Showed Me" / "Sweet Little Jenny". However, soon after releasing the album, the band broke up. (The album was officially re-released on CD in 2004.)

After the breakup
Sailcat leader Wyker, who had been a member of the Rubber Band who recorded the original version of "Let Love Come Between Us" (later a hit for James & Bobby Purify), went on to play with many of the great Southern rock musicians like Eddie Hinton, Dan Penn, Delaney Bramlett, among others. Wyker worked on a benefit project called The Mighty Field of Vision Anthem, a group dedicated to raising funds for musicians who have fallen on hard times. Wyker died at his home on December 8, 2013, at the age of 68.

As for Pickett, he later issued a solo album, Fancy Dancer, on the Elektra label in 1973.

Tributes
On the 1990 Elektra compilation album Rubáiyát, the song "Motorcycle Mama" is covered by the band The Sugarcubes featuring Björk.

Discography

Album
Sail Cat (Motorcycle Mama)

Track listing
Side one:
 "Rainbow Road" John Wyker - 4:00
 "The Thief" Court Pickett - 3:30
 "Highway Rider/Highway Riff" John Wyker & Court Pickett - 5:40
 "The Dream" Court Pickett - 2:45
Side two:
 "If You've Got a Daughter" Court Pickett - 1:33
 "Ambush" John Wyker, Clayton Ivey, Pete Car - 3:06
 "B.B. Gunn" John Wyker - 2:48
 "It'll Be a Long Long Time" Court Pickett - 2:12
 "Motorcycle Mama" John Wyker & Court Pickett - 2:06
 "Walking Together Backwards" John Wyker - 3:19
 "On the Brighter Side of It All" John Wyker - 2:23

Album production credits
Robert L. Heimall - art direction, design
Faye Sanders (tracks: B1, B6, B7), Laura Struzick (tracks: B6, B7), Terry Woodward (tracks: B1, B6, B7) - backing vocals
Tom Russell - banjo
Bob Wray, Court Pickett - bass
John Wyker - concept
Fred Prouty, Lou Mullenix - drums
Al Lester, Scott Boyer - fiddle
Joe Rudd, John Wyker, Pete Carr - guitar
The Memphis Horns (Andrew Love, Ed Logan, Jack Hale, James Mitchell, Wayne Jackson - horns
Jack Davis - illustration
Art Schilling, Chuck Leavell, Clayton Ivey - keyboards
Bill Connell - extra percussion
Frank Bez - photography
Pete Carr - producer, remix engineer
Brenda Hagan, Marlin Greene - sound effects
Jesse Gorell - spoons, buck dancing etc.
Charles Chalmers - strings
Court Pickett (tracks: A2, A3, A4, B1 B4, B5), John Wyker (tracks: A1, A3, B3, B5 to B7) - vocals
Written By – John Wyker (tracks: A1 to A3, B1 to B3, B5 to B7), Pete Carr (tracks: A3b, A4, B2, B4)

Chart positions

Album

Singles

(The latter two singles were non-album cuts.)

See also
 Muscle Shoals, Alabama
 The gafftopsail catfish, known as the sailcat or sail cat

References

External links
 
 Entry at 45cat.com

Rock music groups from Alabama
Musical groups established in 1971
1971 establishments in Alabama